Alex Coletti is an executive producer and director, formerly for MTV Networks and is now as head of Alex Coletti Productions. 
A Brooklyn native and graduate of Brooklyn College, he produced MTV's iconic Unplugged series, was a five-time producer of the VMAs and served as a producer for Super Bowl XXXV and Super Bowl XXXVIII Halftime shows. These shows included many iconic moments such as the Britney Spears/Madonna kiss, the 500 Eminems, and Britney's carrying of a yellow python.

He has been nominated for 3 Emmy Awards for his work with Unplugged.

In 2009 his production company, Alex Coletti Productions, was responsible for the Sundance Channel show "Spectacle: Elvis Costello With...", which ran for 2 seasons, and several specials, including the "Radio City Christmas Spectacular Starring The Rockettes" and "The National Christmas Tree Lighting."

Coletti was also in charge of filming Celtic Woman: Songs from the Heart at the Powerscourt Estate in Ireland in summer 2009 for PBS.

He was also EP and Director of the Rock and Roll Hall of Fame Induction Ceremony for HBO, from 2015-2019, overseeing the inductions of artists such as Green Day, Stevie Ray Vaughan, Pearl Jam, Nina Simone, Journey, Def Leppard, Tupac, Bon Jovi, Stevie Nicks, Roxy Music, Ringo Starr, Janet Jackson, The Cure and others.

He has directed concert performances featuring Lady Gaga, Jay Z, Beyoncé, U2, Kanye West, Pearl Jam, Ed Sheeran, Alicia Keys, Coldplay, Tears For Fears, Rihanna, and The Pope.

He was director of the Tonight Show starring Jimmy Fallon for most of 2021, and directed exec produced Tony Bennett and Lady Gaga One Last Time, which garnered 4 Emmy nods for CBS/Paramount+.

He most recently was EP and director of the South Park 25th anniversary concert, a concert celebrating the music of the cartoon series, starring show creators Matt Stone and Trey Parker and filmed at Red Rocks in Colorado, for Comedy Central and Paramount+.

Coletti is also a producer of the Audible series Words + Music, responsible for episodes featuring such artists as Sting, Smokey Robinson, Sheryl Crow, Alanis Morrissette, Billie Joe Armstrong, Liz Phair, Gary Clark Jr, Eddie Vedder, Beck, Pete Townshend, Carlos Santana and Jeff Tweedy.

References

Year of birth missing (living people)
Living people
Brooklyn College alumni
Lafayette High School (New York City) alumni
MTV people